Alex Alexander may refer to:

 Alex Alexander (swimmer) (born 1945), Australian former swimmer
 Alex Alexander (footballer) (born 1924), footballer for New Brighton and Tranmere Rovers
Alexander Alexander, screenwriter of The Cross-Patch
Alex Alexander (basketball); see Charles R. Smith (coach)